Benedikt Dorsch and Björn Phau were the defending champions, but chose to not participate this year.
Frederik Nielsen and Joseph Sirianni won in the final 6–4, 3–6, [10–6], against Adriano Biasella and Andrey Golubev.

Seeds

Draw

Draw

References
 Doubles Draw

Guzzini Challenger - Doubles
Guzzini Challenger